Qaleh Madreseh or Qaleh-ye Madreseh or Qaleh-ye Madraseh may refer to:
 Qaleh-ye Madraseh, Chaharmahal and Bakhtiari
 Qaleh Madreseh, Behbahan, Khuzestan Province
 Qaleh-ye Madreseh, Masjed Soleyman, Khuzestan Province